The timeline of elections in Canada covers all the provincial, territorial and federal elections from when each province was joined Confederation through to the present day. The table below indicates which party won the election. Several provinces held elections before joining Canada, but only their post-Confederation elections are shown. These include:
 Lower Canada held 15 elections for its Legislative Assembly, from 1792 to 1835;
 Upper Canada held  13 elections to its Legislative Assembly, from 1792 to 1836;
 the Province of Canada held 8 elections for its Legislative Assembly from 1841 to 1863;
New Brunswick's first 21 elections, beginning in 1785 (the 21st Legislative Assembly of New Brunswick was elected in 1866, one year before Confederation, and continued until 1870, three years after Confederation);
Nova Scotia's first 22 elections, beginning in 1758;
Prince Edward Island's first 25 elections, beginning in 1773; and
Newfoundland's first 29 elections, beginning in 1832.

The most recent election is shown with a box limited to five years of government, as this is the maximum length of office, as set by the constitution.  However, elections can be called at any time by an incumbent government. The federal government, nine provinces, and one territory have changed to fixed election dates every four years.  For these legislatures, the box is shown as running until the next scheduled election, but one could still be earlier if the government falls due to a motion of no confidence. Nova Scotia and Yukon do not have fixed election dates in this matter.

Legend

1867–1897

1898–1948

1949–1998
Newfoundland (now Newfoundland and Labrador) joined Canada as a new province in 1949.

1999–present
The territory of Nunavut was created on 1 April 1999, from land previously part of the Northwest Territories.

Notes

Summary
The table below shows how many elections each party has won in each province and territory. The Northwest Territories and Nunavut use consensus government, which means there are no political parties. Of forty-two federal elections, twenty-three have been won by the Liberals, and eighteen by the Conservatives.

See also
 List of Canadian federal general elections
 Canadian electoral calendar
 List of elections in the Province of Canada (pre-Confederation)
 List of federal by-elections in Canada

References

New Brunswick
  (results back to 1956)

Newfoundland and Labrador

Yukon
  (Results back to 1974)
   (Dates of all elections)
  (Non-partisan nature of Legislative Assembly before 1974)

Northwest Territories
 
 
  (1951 to date)

Nunavut

Federal

External links
Elections Canada
CBC Digital Archives — Campaigning for Canada

Elections in Canada